The Bann Bridge is a railway bridge in Coleraine, County Londonderry. It is the only railway bascule bridge in Northern Ireland.

Design 
The bridge is composed of Dorman Long steel girders on reinforced concrete piers, which themselves rest on precast concrete piles. There are 10 spans about 23m apart, 4 on the Derry side of the lifting span, the lifting span itself, and 5 on the Coleraine side. The lifting span is 25m long, single leaf, and weighs 250 tons, counterbalanced by an underhung concrete block. The bridge carries trains on a single track about 7m above the River Bann and is roughly 5m wide. In total it is 240m long.

History 
The current bridge replaced its predecessor, slightly further upstream, in 1924. It carried the Northern Counties Committee line between Belfast and Derry and cost £100,000 (£5,718,383.23 in 2017).

The bridge was closed in 2012 for refurbishment, which was carried out by F.P. McCann.

The bridge is still in use today, carrying the NI Railways Belfast–Derry line. The lifting span is still operational and a special signalling system prevents trains from being in the section whilst the bridge is open.

References 

Railway bridges in Northern Ireland
Coleraine
Buildings and structures in County Londonderry